Thrax or Thraex (Latin borrowing of Ancient Greek Θρᾷξ "Thracian") may be

Historical figures:
 Dionysius Thrax (c. 170-90 BC), a Hellenistic grammarian
 Maximinus Thrax  (c. 173–238), the first "barbarian emperor"
Thrax (mythology), a child of Ares
Thrax, neosapien character in "Exosquad"
Thrax, a virus and the main antagonist in Osmosis Jones
Thrax, a villain from the 15th anniversary episodes of Power Rangers
Thrax, the City of Windowless Rooms from Gene Wolfe's The Book of the New Sun series.
Anthrax

See also
Thraex, a type of gladiator.